Akademie für Alte Musik Berlin (Academy for Early Music Berlin, short name: Akamus) is a German chamber orchestra founded in East Berlin in 1982.  Each year Akamus gives approximately 100 concerts, ranging from small chamber works to large-scale symphonic pieces in Europe's musical centers as well as on tours in Asia, North America and South America.

About 30 musicians form the core of the orchestra. They perform under the leadership of their four concertmasters Midori Seiler, Stephan Mai, Bernhard Forck and Georg Kallweit or guest conductors like René Jacobs, Marcus Creed, Daniel Reuss, Peter Dijkstra and Hans-Christoph Rademann.

Recording exclusively for harmonia mundi France since 1994, the ensemble’s CDs have earned many international prizes, including the Grammy Award, the Diapason d'Or, the Cannes Classical Award, the Gramophone Award and the Edison Award. In 2011 the recording of Mozarts Magic Flute was honoured with the German Record Critics' Award. In 2006 the Recorder Concertos by G. Ph. Telemann with Maurice Steger (CD HMF) have received a number of the most important international awards.

Ever since the reopening of the Berlin Konzerthaus in 1984, the ensemble has its own concert series in Germany’s capital. Furthermore, it has regularly been guest at the Berlin Staatsoper Unter den Linden, Philharmonie Berlin, De Nederlandse Opera in Amsterdam, at the Innsbruck Festival of Early Music and the Carnegie Hall New York.
The ensemble works regularly with the RIAS Kammerchor as well as with soloists like Cecilia Bartoli, Andreas Scholl, Sandrine Piau and Bejun Mehta. 
Moreover, Akamus has extended its artistic boundaries to work together with the modern dance company Sasha Waltz & Guests for productions of Dido and Aeneas (music: Henry Purcell) and Medea (music: Pascal Dusapin).

Awards
 Grammy for Christoph Willibald Gluck: Italian Arias with Cecilia Bartoli, 2002
 International Classical Music Awards for Wolfgang Amadeus Mozart Magic Flute, 2011
 Preis der deutschen Schallplattenkritik for Georg Philipp Telemann: Orpheus (René Jacobs), 1998; Arias for Farinelli, with Vivica Genaux, 2002 and Wolfgang Amadeus Mozart Die Zauberflöte (René Jacobs), 2011
 Choc du Monde de la Musique for Johann Sebastian Bach: Geistliche Kantaten, 1996; Johann Sebastian Bach: Christmas Oratorio, 1997; Arias for Farinelli, 2002; Carl Philipp Emanuel Bach: Sinfonias and Concertos, 2001; Johann Sebastian Bach: Motets, with RIAS-Kammerchor, 2005; Georg Philipp Telemann: Recorder concertos with Maurice Steger, 2006 and Antonio Vivaldi: Double concertos, 2007
 Choc de Classica for Georg Philipp Telemann: Brockes-Passion, 2009 and Wolfgang Amadeus Mozart Magic Flute, 2011
 Diapason d’Or for Alessandro Scarlatti: Il primo omicidio, 1998; Georg Philipp Telemann: La Chasse, 1999; Georg Philipp Telemann: Recorder concertos, 2006; and Reinhard Keiser: Croesus (René Jacobs), 2000; Johann Sebastian Bach: Motets, 2005 and Johann Ludwig Bach: Trauermusik, 2011
 Edison Classical Music Award for Georg Philipp Telemann: La Chasse, 1999 and Reinhard Keiser: Croesus, 2000
 Gramophone Award for Alessandro Scarlatti: Il primo omicidio, 1998 and Georg Friedrich Händel: Ombra mai fù with Andreas Scholl, 1999
 Midem Classical Award for Georg Friedrich Händel: Ombra mai fù, 1999
 Georg-Philipp-Telemann-Preis der Landeshauptstadt Magdeburg, 2006

External links
Harmonia Mundi
Akademie für Alte Musik Berlin (Baroque Orchestra) on bach-cantatas

Early music orchestras
Musical groups established in 1982
1982 establishments in East Germany